The Phare du Cap Leucate is a lighthouse situated on the , located in the south-eastern part of the  in the French Department Aude on the territory of the commune of Leucate. It was constructed in 1950 and illuminated in 1951.
It is an automatic but guarded lighthouse; visits are not permitted. The tower is 19.4 m high.

See also 

 List of lighthouses in France

Sources and references

External links 

 one more photo of the lighthouse Phare du Cap Leucate
 a serie of photos of the lighthouse Phare du Cap Leucate

Buildings and structures in Aude
Lighthouses completed in 1950
Lighthouses in France